Domicile may refer to:

 Home, a place where someone lives
 Domicile (astrology), the zodiac sign over which a planet has rulership
 Domicile (law), the status or attribution of being a permanent resident in a particular jurisdiction

See also
 Residence (disambiguation)